Crystal Lake Entertainment Inc. is a Los Angeles-based multi-media production company. The company was named after the storied lake from founder and CEO, Sean S. Cunningham's landmark film, Friday the 13th. Their first released project was XCU: Extreme Close Up.

Filmography
 Jason Goes to Hell: The Final Friday (1993) (as Sean S. Cunningham Films) 
 XCU: Extreme Close Up (2001)
 Jason X (2001)
 Terminal Invasion (2002)
 Freddy vs. Jason (2003)
 Friday the 13th (2009)
 The Last House on the Left (2009)

Television
 Friday the 13th (announced)

References

External links
 Official website (discontinued as of August 2021)
 Crystal Lake Entertainment on Facebook
 Crystal Lake Entertainment on Twitter

Film production companies of the United States